X 2000, also called SJ X2 or simply as X2, is an electric tilting train operated by SJ in Sweden. It was constructed by Kalmar Verkstad in Kalmar, Sweden (prior to the company being bought by Adtranz in 1996) and launched in 1990 as a first-class only train with a meal included in the ticket price, and free use of the train's fax machine. There is a bistro on board that serves snack bar-style dishes. From 1995 second class was introduced. All trains are equipped with Wi-Fi for passenger access to the Internet and were repainted grey as of 2005. The trains also have electric power supply sockets at all seats in both first and second class. The trains have been fitted with repeaters to improve mobile phone reception.

The reason the X2 was chosen was that Sweden (like most other countries) has very curved railways, and not enough traffic to justify building special high-speed railway lines (at least before 1990). As a result, a Swedish tilting train had to be developed. A tilting train provided the advantages of high speed and comfort for the passengers, as tilting trains can run through sharp (short radius or tight) curves up to 15% faster than non-tilting trains. The X2 was designed and built by ASEA. SJ ordered 20 sets in August 1986 and planned to order a further 30. In the end 43 sets were built for SJ while one was built for the Guangshen Railway Company, China.

Name

X 2000 was originally a brand name for a number of train connections with a certain service level. Generally the X2 train is used, but because of lack of vehicles, sometimes (especially in 2009/2010) other train types have previously been used, like X40 or Rc loco-hauled stock. After the introduction of the X55 in 2012 to replace the X2 on smaller routes such as Stockholm-Sundsvall, other train types are very rarely used on these lines. Since December 2011, all high speed services of SJ using X2 or X55 trains are called SJ Snabbtåg (lit. "SJ High-speed train").

Speed
It reached  during a trial run with double power car units in 1993. The 19th century railways Stockholm–Gothenburg/Malmö are relatively straight, since they were planned the shortest way without taking intermediate cities into account, and the landscape is relatively flat. Other 19th-century railways are generally curvier.

In comparison to other high-speed trains, the X 2000 is not particularly fast; but compared to regular train services, it cuts journey time by about 10–15% – enough to make it competitive with airlines on many routes. However, the introduction of the new Stadler Flirt X74 trains in 2015 for MTR Express, which competes with the X 2000 on the busy Stockholm–Gothenburg route, meant the X 2000 now has at most only a 9% theoretical speed advantage compared to the X74, making it unlikely for any new tilting trains to be introduced in Sweden in the future.

SJ considered configuring the trainset with a sixth trailing car and creating a set of 12 trailer cars using a second power car.

Lines and services

Former lines and services
 In 2000–2004, seven trains were operated by Linx on the lines Oslo–Gothenburg–Malmö–Copenhagen and Oslo–Stockholm. Linx was a joint venture between SJ and its Norwegian counterpart NSB. It was wound up when SJ wanted to move the trains to more profitable lines in Sweden. Low-fares airlines also played a part in siphoning off passengers from the comparatively slow Linx services, the main ones taking well in excess of three hours.
 Briefly in 2010–2011 X 2000 trains ran once daily between Stockholm and Odense.
 In 2012–2013, when SJ received its X55 trains, X 2000 services were suspended on a number of routes and reduced on others.
 One example is Stockholm–Sundsvall, with one daily departure, calling at Arlanda, Uppsala, Gävle, Söderhamn, Hudiksvall and Sundsvall. This route formerly used a single X 2000 trainset until it was replaced with X55.

Current lines and services
Stockholm–Gothenburg, calling at Södertälje Syd, Katrineholm, Hallsberg, Skövde, Herrljunga, Alingsås and Gothenburg. Not all trains call at all stations Since 2015 MTRX has competed with SJ on this route and Flixtrain since 2020.
Stockholm–Oslo, calling at Södertälje Syd, Katrineholm, Hallsberg, Degerfors, Kristinehamn, Karlstad and Arvika before crossing the border to Norway, calling at Kongsvinger and finally Oslo S. From December 2018 until 2022 the X 2000 trains to Oslo are replaced with loco-hauled stock due to track work in Norway. A few X 2000 trains are used in services towards Karlstad.
Stockholm–Malmö, with many trains continuing to Copenhagen, calling at Södertälje Syd, Norrköping, Linköping, Mjölby (occasionally), Nässjö, Alvesta, Älmhult (occasionally), Hässleholm, Lund and Malmö. For a short period during 2010–2011, there was one daily train to/from Odense.

2008 new high-speed trains
In 2008 SJ ordered 20 X55 Bombardier Regina trains to replace the X 2000 on lines with lower demand and where its performance cannot be fully utilised (especially on lines north of Stockholm such as the Botniabanan).
When these trains were delivered in 2012 and 2013 the X 2000 trains could be concentrated to fewer lines with bigger demands such as Stockholm–Malmö/Copenhagen and Stockholm–Gothenburg, using double-length X 2000 between Stockholm and Gothenburg during rush hours and weekends.

Renovation 
In January 2014, SJ announced that it was to invest 3.5 billion SEK in the modernisation and repowering of its X 2000 fleet, in order to extend the life of the trains by 20–25 years. SJ stated that the refurbishment of the trains would cost one third of the price of replacing them with new trains, whilst also having a reduced environmental impact.  

ABB, whose predecessor ASEA designed and built the trains, were awarded the contract to replace the trains' traction converters, transformers, battery chargers, train control systems, and passenger information and entertainment equipment.

Additionally to the technical improvements, the new refurbished X 2000s feature a new livery with a dark grey front, as well as a rebuilt interior with new seats allowing for 15% higher seating capacity, new walls, ceilings, floors and lighting, and a rebuilt bistro. The new interiors were awarded a Red Dot Design Award in 2020, with the jury stating:"With its perfectly harmonised colours and materials, the interior for the SJ X2000 [sic] high-speed train creates a particularly pleasant atmosphere. The elaboration in detail and the lighting concept create a peaceful ambience in the train compartment."The refurbished trains were originally scheduled to start introduction in 2019, however the first refurbished set started operation in November 2021.

Effect on the railway 

The train has had a major effect on SJ and the country's railway. More passengers, together with the lower operating costs associated with operating trains faster and more efficiently, helped SJ become profitable.

It also proved to Swedes that rail is a viable solution not just in exotic densely populated foreign countries, but also at home in Sweden. In 1991, the Swedish government started a massive investment program, spending 5–10 billion kronor annually on improvements to the rail network. The program continues today. A milestone was reached in the late 1990s when the number of trips taken by train in Sweden exceeded the 1940s level for the first time.

New links built since 1990 include the Øresund Bridge, the Arlanda Airport link, Södertälje–Huddinge, Söderhamn–Enånger, Varberg–Kungsbacka and Helsingborg–Lund. The X 2000 train contributed to building public support for these large projects.

The fast-growing popularity of the trains has created problems with capacity. The time taken for the X 2000 trains were longer in 2008 than in 2000. For Stockholm–Malmö the fastest train took 21 minutes longer in 2008 compared to 2000. It is the congestion on the railways that impedes the fast trains, especially the prioritised fastest connections. The railways are used by fast X 2000 trains, slower passenger trains, and much slower freight trains.

Exports

The manufacturer of the X 2000 had tried to sell the train to countries other than Sweden, but with mixed success. In connection with the sales attempts the train was tested and demonstrated in some countries. Norway, Finland, Germany, Austria, France, China, Australia, Portugal and the US were mentioned as candidates.

An X 2000 toured the United States in 1992–1993 on lease to Amtrak. It was tested by Amtrak from October 1992 until January 1993. It was used in revenue service on the Northeast Corridor between New York City and Washington DC for about five months, from February until May and from August until September 1993. From May until July it was taken on a national tour around the 48 continental states for demonstration stops at significant stations. It also toured parts of Canada.

In 1995, three X 2000 cars (SJ2819, SJ2620 and SJ2520) were hired by Australian operator CountryLink for evaluation purposes, being one driving trailer, one bistro car and one first class car. The trains were towed in a push/pull mode by modified XPT power cars XP2000 and XP2009. After conducting a statewide tour of New South Wales in March 1995, they were used on Sydney to Canberra services from April to June 1995. The X2 was also tested in Norway and Germany. There were competitors which had lower prices, including Pendolino and ICE T.

The Guangshen Railway Company in China leased and later purchased outright an X 2000 train which it named Xinshisu (New Speed). The train served as Guangzhou–Kowloon through train from 1998 until 2007 when it was replaced by the Regina-based CRH1. The train was initially supposed to have been given the number 2044, but due to the fact that the number "4" sounds similar to the word for "death" in the Chinese language, it was renumbered as 2088, of which the number "8" symbolises luck in Chinese culture. It was delivered to Sichuan Province in August 2007. Due to the 2008 Sichuan earthquake, Chengdu Railway Bureau needed to rebuild the railway networks in Sichuan Province. Also, the authority could not carry the maintenance costs of the train. It was therefore returned to the Guangshen Railway Company in late December 2008. In 2012 the train was purchased by SJ and repatriated back to Sweden. The train had some serious damage and deferred maintenance. The trailer cabs (110986 CUB2XFK) were scrapped after being displayed at the Swedish Railway Museum. The power car (2088 CX2) and five of the trailer cars (110987 through 110991 CUBS2FK) were repaired and re-entered service in 2020.

Technical
However, since 1990 a lot of new high speed lines have been constructed in Sweden, both upgraded lines and new lines. These upgraded or new lines always have ATC, continuously welded rails on concrete sleepers and no crossings with road and rail at the same level. The tilting function is not used on these lines.

The X2 trains have mostly run at the X 2000 service level, but have periodically been used for Linx traffic (2000–2004) as well as regional services, for which fewer coaches were used to improve acceleration. All X2 trains are maintained at Hagalund depot in Stockholm and Olskroken depot located just before Gothenburg Central Station.

Technical data X2 power car

Technical data X2 passenger coaches

Each train also has a UB2X coach with a driver's place, and a URB2 coach with a simple restaurant.

In the beginning there were many more UA2 first class coaches than UB2 second class coaches. But after a decision that state employees should normally use second class for train journeys in their works instead of first class, something many companies followed, many UA2 have been rebuilt into UB2.

References

External links

Spec Sheet; French

Adtranz multiple units
High-speed trains of China
High-speed trains of Sweden
Passenger trains running at least at 200 km/h in commercial operations
X2
Tilting trains
Train-related introductions in 1989
Electric multiple units with locomotive-like power cars
25 kV AC multiple units
15 kV AC multiple units